The 2000 Governor General's Awards for Literary Merit were presented by Adrienne Clarkson, Governor General of Canada, and Jean-Louis Roux, Chairman of the Canada Council for the Arts, on November 14 at Rideau Hall.

English-language finalists

Fiction
Michael Ondaatje, Anil's Ghost
Margaret Atwood, The Blind Assassin
Austin Clarke, The Question
David Adams Richards, Mercy Among the Children
Eden Robinson, Monkey Beach

Poetry
Don McKay, Another Gravity
George Bowering, His Life
A. F. Moritz, Rest on the Flight into Egypt
John Pass, Water Stair
Patricia Young, Ruin and Beauty

Drama
Timothy Findley, Elizabeth Rex
George Boyd, Consecrated Ground
Linda Griffiths, Alien Creature
Daniel MacIvor and Daniel Brooks, Monster
Jason Sherman, It's All True

Non-fiction
Nega Mezlekia, Notes from the Hyena's Belly
Robert Bringhurst, A Story as Sharp as a Knife
Trevor Herriot, River in a Dry Land
A. B. McKillop, The Spinster and the Prophet

Children's literature (text)
Deborah Ellis, Looking for X
Martha Brooks, Being with Henry
Sharon E. McKay, Charlie Wilcox
Sheldon Oberman, The Shaman's Nephew
Duncan Thornton, Kalifax

Children's literature (illustration)
Marie-Louise Gay, Yuck, A Love Story
Nelly and Ernst Hofer, The Snow Queen
Marthe Jocelyn, Hannah's Collections
Regolo Ricci, The Market Wedding
Cybèle Young, Pa's Harvest

French-to-English translation
Robert Majzels, Just Fine (France Daigle, Pas pire)
Sheila Fischman, Terra Firma (Christiane Frenette, La Terre ferme)
Linda Gaboriau, Down Dangerous Passes Road (Michel Marc Bouchard, Le chemin des Passes-dangereuses)
Bobby Theodore, 15 Seconds (François Archambault, 15 secondes)

French-language finalists

Fiction
Jean-Marc Dalpé, Un vent se lève qui éparpille
Christiane Duchesne, L'Homme des silences
Roger Magini, Styx
Pierre Samson, Il était une fois une ville
Alison Lee Strayer, Jardin et prairie

Poetry
Normand de Bellefeuille, La Marche de l'aveugle sans son chien
Martine Audet, Orbites
Joël Des Rosiers, Vétiver
Madeleine Gagnon, Rêve de pierre
Claude Paré, Exécuté en chambre

Drama
Wajdi Mouawad, Littoral
Geneviève Billette, Crime contre l'humanité
Serge Boucher, 24 Poses
Jasmine Dubé, L'Arche de Noémie
Lise Vaillancourt, Le petit dragon and La balade de Fannie et Carcassonne

Non-fiction
Gérard Bouchard, Genèse des nations et cultures du Nouveau Monde
Brian T. Fitch, À l'ombre de la littérature
Olga Hazan, Le mythe du progrès artistique
Yves Lavertu, Jean-Charles Harvey
Robert Major, Convoyages

Children's literature (text)
Charlotte Gingras, Un été de Jade
Guy Dessureault, L'homme au chat
François Gravel, L'été de la moustache
Gilles Tibo, La Planète du petit géant
Hélène Vachon, Le délire de Somerset

Children's literature (illustration)
Anne Villeneuve, L'Écharpe rouge
Marie-Louise Gay, Sur mon île
Pascale Constantin, Gloups!, Bébé-vampire
Geneviève Côté, La grande aventure d'un petit mouton noir
Gérard DuBois, Riquet à la Houppe

English-to-French translation
Lori Saint-Martin and Paul Gagné, Un parfum de cèdre
Jude Des Chênes, L'honneur du guerrier
Dominique Issenhuth, Amants

External links
 The Canada Council: CUMULATIVE LIST OF FINALISTS FOR THE GOVERNOR GENERAL'S LITERARY AWARDS

References

Governor General's Awards
Governor General's Awards
Governor General's Awards